Třeboň is a spa town in Jindřichův Hradec District in the South Bohemian Region of the Czech Republic. It has about 8,100 inhabitants. The town centre with the castle complex is well preserved and is protected by law as an urban monument reservation.

Administrative parts

Třeboň is made up of town parts of Třeboň I and Třeboň II, and villages of Branná, Břilice, Holičky, Nová Hlína, Přeseka and Stará Hlína.

Geography

Třeboň lies in the Třeboň Basin. It is known for its bogs with rich deposits of peat, which led to establishment of peat spa in the town.

Třeboň is known for its fish ponds, which were established in the region since Middle Ages. It was built between 1584 and 1590. It is primarily a fish pond, but also is used for sport and recreational purposes.

The whole municipal territory lies in the Třeboňsko Protected Landscape Area. The river Lužnice flows through the eastern part of the territory and supplies Rožmberk pond with water. There are many small watercourses, which supplies the other ponds.

History

Třeboň was established around the middle of the 12th century. Around 1300, Třeboň was already fortified. In 1341, it was first referred to as a town. In 1366, Třeboň's Czech name first appeared, and the Rosenberg family became owner of the estate. During their rule, the town gained importance and wealth. In 1376, Třeboň gained royal town privileges. At the end of the 14th century, the fortifications strengthened, which helped resist attacks during the Hussite Wars.

The greatest development occurred in the 16th and early 17th centuries, when Jakub Krčín was at the head of the Rosenberg family business and started to establish new ponds in the area. The region became famous as a fish pond farming area. The end of prosperity came with extinction of the Rosenberg family, troop invasions, and several large fires. Třeboň further suffered during the Thirty Years' War, when it was held by a regiment of Scots led by Colonel Sir John Seton from 1620 to early 1622. From 1660 to the 20th century, the House of Schwarzenberg owned the town and the estate.

The town slowly recovered and remained economically unimportant until the 19th century, when it became a district town. Until 1918, Třeboň – Wittingau (Wittingau until the end of the 19th century) was part of the Austrian monarchy (Austria side after the compromise of 1867), in the district with the same name, one of the 94 Bezirkshauptmannschaften in Bohemia.

After the World War II, the first larger industry (clothing factory and large-scale agricultural production) was established in the town. In 1960, the Třeboň district was abolished and the town received spa status.

Demographics

Economy
Třeboň is a tourist destination, and this is the area's major economic activity, along with agriculture, the spa industry and other services. 

The State Regional Archive for South Bohemia is based here, where genealogical studies about people born in the South Bohemian Region may be conducted. Digital images of parish registers and other genealogical records from the archive have been placed on the internet. The archive was held at the 15th-century Třeboň castle for many years, although a substantial portion was moved to the municipal offices in 2014.

Spa

The spa company Slatinné lázně Třeboň s.r.o. is the largest employer in the town. The peat spa in Třeboň focuses on the treatment of musculoskeletal disorders, rheumatic problems, and post-injury and post-surgery reconvalescence. The first modern spa in Třeboň was opened in 1883.

Culture
The International Festival of Animated Films Anifest was held in Třeboň each May between 2002 and 2010; after that, Anifilm took its place.

Sights

The natural centre of the town's historic core is Masarykovo Square. It is surrounded by burgher houses with Renaissance and Baroque facades. In the centre there are a Renaissance stone fountain from 1569, and a Baroque Marian column. The main landmark is the Old Town Hall, built in 1563.

Třeboň Castle is a Renaissance castle. A small stone castle in Třeboň was first mentioned in 1374. The current castle was created in 1565–1575 by reconstruction of old castle buildings damaged by fire. The castle includes an English-style castle park.

Church of Our Lady Queen and Saint Giles is the largest building in the complex of the former Augustinian monastery. The monastery was founded in 1367 by the Rosenberg family and construction of the church began the same year. The monastery was abolished in 1785.

The entrance to the town was guarded by massive gates, which are together with fragments of town walls preserved to this day.

In popular culture
The TV series The Territory of White Deer was filmed in Třeboň.

Notable people

Master of the Třeboň Altarpiece, 14th-century painter
John Dee and Edward Kelley held a number of seances and conducted alchemical experiments in Třeboň in 1589
Karel Čurda (1911–1947), Nazi collaborant
Erwin Scharf (1914–1994), Austrian politician
Karel Mejta Sr. (1928–2015), rower, Olympic winner
Stanislav Lusk (1931–1987), rower, Olympic winner
Jan Jindra (1932–2021), rower, Olympic winner
Karel Poborský (born 1972), footballer
Iveta Lutovská (born 1983), Czech Miss 2009

Twin towns – sister cities

Třeboň is twinned with:
 Freyung-Grafenau (district), Germany
 Interlaken, Switzerland
 Schrems, Austria
 Utena, Lithuania

References

External links

Official tourist portal
Regional tourist portal
Třeboň Castle

 
Cities and towns in the Czech Republic
Spa towns in the Czech Republic
Populated places in Jindřichův Hradec District